Melicope broadbentiana, commonly known as false euodia, is a species of shrub or tree in the family Rutaceae and is endemic to Queensland. It has simple leaves, trifoliate leaves or both, and small white flowers borne in short panicles in leaf axils.

Description
Melicope broadbentiana is a tree that typically grows to a height of  but also forms flowers and fruit as a shrub. The leaves are simple and/or trifoliate and arranged in opposite pairs. The flowers are bisexual, male-only, female only, or both male-only and female-only.

Taxonomy

Distribution and habitat

Conservation status
This species is classified as of "least concern" under the Queensland Government Nature Conservation Act 1992.

References

broadbentiana
Sapindales of Australia
Flora of Queensland
Plants described in 1891
Taxa named by Frederick Manson Bailey